Ian Dewhurst (born 13 November 1990) is an Australian athlete specialising in the 400 metres hurdles. He won a bronze medal at the 2013 Summer Universiade. In addition, he represented his country at the 2014 and 2018 Commonwealth Games without qualifying for the final. In July 2019, he won a gold medal at the 2019 Pacific Games in Apia, where he set a Games record of 50.86 seconds.

His personal best in the event is 49.52 seconds set in Melbourne in 2014.

International competitions

References

External links 
 Ian Dewhurst at Athletics Australia
 Ian Dewhurst at Australian Athletics Historical Results
 

1990 births
Living people
Australian male hurdlers
Athletes (track and field) at the 2014 Commonwealth Games
Athletes (track and field) at the 2018 Commonwealth Games
Commonwealth Games competitors for Australia
Universiade medalists in athletics (track and field)
Universiade bronze medalists for Australia
Australian Athletics Championships winners
Medalists at the 2013 Summer Universiade
20th-century Australian people
21st-century Australian people